August Friedrich Wilhelm Orth (25 July 1828, Windhausen - 11 May 1901, Berlin) was a German architect and designer.

Life and work 
He was the son of a manor tenant. In 1834, his family relocated to Korbach. After graduating from secondary school there, in 1848, he attended the Technical University of Braunschweig, where he studied architecture. He also studied painting at the local art school. In 1850, he transferred to the Bauakademie in Berlin. His instructors there included Friedrich August Stüler, Heinrich Strack, Karl Bötticher and Wilhelm Stier, who introduced him to the newer trends. In 1854, he passed the examination for construction manager. Unable to find work immediately, he chose instead to pursue his artistic studies, at the Prussian Academy of Arts.

He attempted to establish himself as an architect by entering competitions. After  a study trip throughout Germany, he performed some professional work for the Bergisch-Markisch Railway Company, and passed his Master Builder examination at  the Prussian Academy in 1858. 

More study trips followed; to France and Italy. From 1861 to 1862, he worked for Bergisch-Markisch again, then found employment with the Berlin–Görlitz Railway Company, becoming the head of their technical office in 1868. He then opened his own architectural firm. His most important client was the railway magnate, Bethel Henry Strousberg. He designed and built two of his homes: the Palais Strousberg on Wilhelmstraße in Berlin, and his family estate, Schloss Zbirow, in Bohemia.

From 1871 to 1873, he developed a proposal for a "Berliner Centralbahn", a four-track, circular, light-rail system, but it was viewed as impractical. From 18772 to 1877, he served on the board of the "Architektenvereins zu Berlin" (Architects' Association). In 1877, he became a "Baurat" (Building Official), and was promoted to Geheimrat in 1893. He was awarded the Order of the Red Eagle, 4th class, in 1884. He was also a member of the Prussian Academy, and an honorary member of the Academy of Fine Arts, Vienna.

References

Further reading 
 Uwe Kieling: "Berliner Privatarchitekten und Eisenbahnbaumeister im 19. Jahrhundert" (Miniaturen zur Geschichte, Kultur und Denkmalpflege Berlins, Nr. 26.) Berlin 1988
 Angela Nickel, "Ein Architekt im Übergang. August Orth (1828–1901)", In: Berlinische Monatsschrift, Vol.3, 1996, pp.36-42  (Online)
 Elke Herden: "Kirchen für die moderne Großstadt. Der Beitrag August Orths zum protestantischen Kirchenbau im Berlin des 19. Jahrhunderts" (Arbeitshefte des Instituts für Stadt- und Regionalplanung der Technischen Universität Berlin, Vol.38) Berlin 1988

External links 

 
 Entry for August Orth @ the Architecture Museum of the Technische Universität Berlin

1828 births
1901 deaths
19th-century German architects
People from Osterode (district)
People from the Duchy of Brunswick
Technical University of Braunschweig alumni
Academy of Fine Arts, Munich alumni